Florin Constantin Niță (born 3 July 1987) is a Romanian professional footballer who plays as a goalkeeper for Czech First League club Pardubice, on loan from Sparta Prague, and the Romania national team.

He started his senior career at Concordia Chiajna, before signing for FCSB in 2013. Niță won six honours during his spell with the capital-based team, and at the start of 2018 transferred to the Czech Republic with Sparta Prague.

Niță earned his first cap for the Romania national team in November 2017, in a 2–0 friendly win against Turkey.

Club career

Early career / Concordia Chiajna
Born in Bucharest, Niță started playing football at the age of seven with FC Steaua București. In 2001, he moved to local rivals Rapid București, where he stayed for four years. He then spent his last season as a junior at Astra Ploiești.

In 2006, aged 19, Niță joined Concordia Chiajna and played his first senior matches in the Liga III, the third level of the Romanian league system. He made his debut with the team in the Liga I on 25 July 2011, in a 1–2 home loss to Sportul Studențesc.

FCSB
In December 2012, it was announced that Niță would return to his boyhood club FC Steaua București in the summer of the following year. He started to appear frequently for the Roș-albaștrii in the 2015–16 season, in which he recorded 32 matches in all competitions.

On 16 August 2016, Niță saved one of the two penalty kicks missed by Sergio Agüero in the 0–5 UEFA Champions League play-off loss to Manchester City. In May 2017, Niță agreed to a new deal at the team, now named FCSB, that would have kept him in Bucharest until 2021. His good display in 2017 earned him third place in Gazeta Sporturilors Romanian Footballer of the Year award, which he shared with Ștefan Radu.

Sparta Prague
Niță transferred to Czech team Sparta Prague on 1 February 2018 for an undisclosed fee, rumoured to be €2 million plus €500,000 in bonuses.

In December 2021, Niță was named the Romanian Footballer of the Year by both the CSJ Association and the Gazeta Sporturilor daily for his performances throughout the calendar year.

Sparta Prague loaned Niță out to Pardubice for the remainder of the 2022–23 season.

International career
On 18 March 2017, following the injury of Silviu Lung Jr., Niță was picked by manager Christoph Daum in Romania's squad for a 2018 FIFA World Cup qualifier against Denmark. Days before his call-up, former Romanian internationals Helmuth Duckadam, Gheorghe Hagi and Laurențiu Reghecampf stated that his omissal from the squad was "unjust".

Niță eventually made his debut for the full side on 9 November 2017, entering as a 71st-minute substitute for Costel Pantilimon in a 2–0 friendly win over Turkey in Cluj-Napoca. After Ciprian Tătărușanu announced his retirement from the national team at the end of 2020, Niță played the full 90 minutes in all three 2022 FIFA World Cup qualifying matches against North Macedonia, Germany and Armenia in March 2021. In spite of the fact that Romania lost against the latter two, his performances were praised by media and fans alike.

Career statistics 

Club

International

HonoursFCSBLiga I: 2013–14, 2014–15
Cupa României: 2014–15
Supercupa României: 2013
Cupa Ligii: 2014–15, 2015–16Sparta PragueCzech Cup: 2019–20Individual'''Gazeta Sporturilor Romanian Footballer of the Year: 2021; third place: 2017 
CSJ Gala Fotbalului Românesc'' Romanian Footballer of the Year: 2021
Liga I Team of the Season: 2016–17

References

External links
 
 
 

1987 births
Living people
Footballers from Bucharest
Romanian footballers
Association football goalkeepers
Liga I players
Liga II players
Liga III players
CS Concordia Chiajna players
FC Steaua București players
Czech First League players
AC Sparta Prague players
FK Pardubice players
Romania international footballers
Romanian expatriate footballers
Expatriate footballers in the Czech Republic
Romanian expatriate sportspeople in the Czech Republic